Telkoi is an Odisha Legislative Assembly constituency of Kendujhar district, Odisha, India.

Area of this constituency includes Telkoi block, Harichandanpur block and 16 GPs (Banspal, Baragarh, Bayakumutia, Gonasika, Jatra, Kalanda, Karangdihi, Kuanr, Nayakote, Phuljhar, Saharapur, Singhpur, Talakadakala, Tana, Taramakant and Uppar Raigoda) of Banspal block.

Elected Members

14 elections held during 1961 to 2019. List of members elected from Telkoi Vidhan Sabha constituency are:

2019: (20): Premananda Nayak (BJD)
2014: (20): Bedabyasa Nayak (BJD)
2009: (20): Premananda Naik (BJD)
2004: (145): Niladri Naik (BJD)
2000: (145): Niladri Naik (BJD)
1995: (145): Chandrasen Naik (Congress)
1990: (145): Niladri Naik (Janata Dal)
1985: (145): Pranab Ballav Naik (Congress)
1980: (145): Chandrasen Naik (Congress-I) 
1977: (145): Niladri Naik (Janata Dal)
1974: (145): Niladri Naik (Utkal Congress)
1971: (128): Niladri Naik (Utkal Congress)
1967: (128): Bhagirathi Mohapatra (Swatantra)
1961: (70): Gobinda Munda (Ganatantra Parishad)

Election results

2019
In 2019 election Biju Janata Dal candidate Premananda Naik, defeated Bharatiya Janata Party candidate Dhanurjaya Sidu by a margin of 5,920 votes.

2014

2009

Notes

References

Kendujhar district
Assembly constituencies of Odisha